Aethes mauritanica is a species of moth of the family Tortricidae. It was described  by Walsingham in 1898. It is found on Sardinia and Cyprus and in Spain, Germany, Italy, Bulgaria, Greece, Morocco, Libya and Turkey.

The forewings are pale primrose (yellow) with a chestnut streak and two chestnut fasciae sprinkled with silvery scales. The hindwings are tawny brownish grey. Adults are on wing from April to July.

The larvae feed on Elaeoselinum meoides.

References

mauritanica
Moths described in 1898
Moths of Europe
Moths of Africa
Moths of Asia